The 1963 Miracle Match was an Australian rules football game contested in the second half of the 1963 VFL season home-and-away competition’s round 10 "split round" matches.

The match, between the Fitzroy Football Club and the Geelong Football Club, and attended by 16,221 spectators at the Brunswick Street Oval in North Fitzroy, Victoria, on 6 July 1963, was one of the major highlights of the 1960s, wherein the young, inexperienced (and, for the 1963 season, winless) Fitzroy team unexpectedly, comprehensively — and, for some, "miraculously" — beat the experienced and powerful Geelong team, 9.13 (67) to 3.13 (31): a team that had finished second on the 1962 VFL Ladder, had already won six, and drawn one, of its nine home-and-away matches, and would eventually go on to win the 1963 VFL Grand Final and premiership.

The game was notable for the extensive, detailed, and well-structured team strategies and player-against-player tactics devised by Wally Clark (the stand-in coach-for-the-day), such that, in addition to Fitzroy playing an ideal game on a very muddy and waterlogged Brunswick Street Oval, the Fitzroy players, severally and collectively, not only played an inspired and tenacious game but also completely countered and nullified the experienced Geelong champions Polly Farmer and Bill Goggin, preventing them from combining with one another and, in addition, kept Geelong's full-forward John Sharrock goalless for the match.

Background
Given that Fitzroy had lost the first nine home-and-away matches in the 1963 VFL season, and with its opponents being the powerful Geelong side that would go on to win the 1963 VFL premiership (14 of whom would play against Fitzroy on that day), nobody gave the Fitzroy team a chance.

The game was predicted to be such a one-sided affair that none of the Melbourne radio stations bothered to send a commentator to broadcast the match.

Weather
Although the first half of the "split round" matches had been played under relatively good conditions at Victoria Park, Princes Park, and the Junction Oval on 29 June 1963, the heavy rainfall that Melbourne experienced over the ensuing week had seriously affected the condition of all of the VFL grounds on the day of the match.

Postponement of Round 11
It is also significant that, on the following Saturday morning (13 July 1963) — based upon reports that the majority of the grounds upon which games were scheduled to be played that afternoon "were completely waterlogged" — the VFL’s adverse-weather committee made the unanimous decision to postpone all of the Round 11 matches until the following Saturday and, in the process, move each of the season's scheduled rounds to a week later.

The weather that Melbourne experienced over that weekend proved that the committee's decision was well justified — not only did the storms and heavy rainfall cause widespread flooding in the Glenroy (Merlynston Creek) and Elsternwick-Gardenvale (Elwood Canal) areas, extensive power outages over a wide range of suburbs, and the postponement of the entire Grand National Steeple meeting at the low-lying and water-logged Flemington Racecourse, but also forced the closure of the Newport to Altona railway line for several days.

The Brunswick Street Oval
In addition to the playing arena itself being rather low-lying and very poorly drained—a situation that meant that whenever there was heavy rain, the Brunswick Street Oval had a strong tendency to be very muddy and seriously waterlogged for weeks on end; the long, thin, and (comparatively) rectangular shape of Fitzroy's home ground, even when completely dry, always demanded significant tactical adjustments in visiting teams, especially those accustomed to playing their matches on wide, and (comparatively) circular-shaped oval football fields such as the MCG.

The teams
The Fitzroy selectors made eight changes to the previous round's team: five of which were "forced" upon them, and three which were not. The selected team was very inexperienced; it had seven teenagers, and only six members of the team had played more than 18 senior games.

The Geelong selectors made five changes to the previous round's team: two of which were "forced" upon them, and three which were not. The selected team was far more experienced than the Fitzroy team: eleven (including Graham "Polly" Farmer, with a total of 190 WAFL and VFL games) had played more than 35 senior games over a number of seasons, and fourteen would later play in the 1963 VFL Grand Final and win the 1963 premiership.

The coaches-for-the-day were Wally Clark, the captain-coach of the Fitzroy Reserves, and Neil Trezise, the coach of the Geelong Reserves. This was the only occasion that either of them ever coached a VFL senior team.

Friday, 5 July 1963
On the evening before the match, Wally Clark called all of the Fitzroy players together and quietly, thoroughly, and carefully explained — in very clear, precise, and simple terms — how all of them were to play (collectively) as a team, how each of them was to play as an individual and, in particular, how each of them was to play, on the day, against their specific opponent.

Clark methodically stressed the importance, regardless of the end to which the team was kicking, of attacking along the dryer (northern) grandstand side of the ground, and defending along the far more water-logged (southern) "outer" side of the ground. He demanded that they concentrate on tackling hard and keeping close to their opponents at all times, and that they continuously back each other up — and, as often as they could, use handball directly to the team-mate that was backing up. In general play, he instructed them to keep their opponents between themselves and the boundary: see, for instance, the two-on-one tackle in the photograph at McFarlane (2014). He spoke of the degree to which left-footed players such as Polly Farmer, Tony Pollinelli, Garry Hamer, and John Sharrock, could be destabilized by coming at them from their right side: see for example, the photograph of Norm Brown and John Hayes, coming in together from the centre of the ground, on the right side of the left-footer Garry Hamer, who is on the boundary side of the ground. In particular, he instructed the (comparatively) inexperienced ruckman, Bryan Clements — whose last 10 senior games, over three seasons (1961-1963) had been with losing Fitzroy teams, and who had been specifically promoted from the Seconds for this special reason — to come in from the right side of Polly Farmer at each bounce and boundary throw-in, bump him, and allow the other (even less experienced) Fitzroy ruckman, Ron Fry (in only his fourth VFL game), to go for the hit-out unimpeded and unchallenged.

Saturday, 6 July 1963

The two "curtain raisers"
On the day of the match Geelong's Third XVIII (under 19s) and Second XVIII had already (rather easily) won their games against Fitzroy, 10.11 (71) to 6.10 (46), and 8.13 (61) to 4.8 (32), respectively.

Pre-Match
Prior to delivering his pre-game address to the team, Wally Clark made sure that each individual player clearly understood and could remember the instructions they had been given on the previous evening.

Clark took the unusual step of opening the Fitzroy rooms to as many of the supporters that could squeeze in — the regular coach, Kevin Murray, routinely excluded all except the players from the change-rooms before the matches and at half-time — and delivered an impressive, inspiring, and stirring speech, continuously interspersed by the ever more raucous cheers and encouragement of the assembled supporters, which sent the players out onto the field fully aroused, motivated, and eager to begin the contest.
"A key factor in us winning the game was how (Clark) mentally prepared us. The frame of mind we were in was just incredible. We went out there to face Goliath, and they went out there to face David, and that was the difference in the two teams. And that was all because of Wally Clark. I don’t remember running onto the ground, he just had us so worked up. We all played roles on the field, but Wally Clark was the star that day." — Bryan Clements' 2014 recollection of the day.

First quarter
The Fitzroy captain, Ron Harvey, won the toss and elected to kick, with the breeze, to the (northern) railway end, which also meant that the Fitzroy team's right-hand side was on the comparatively dryer grandstand side of the muddy and waterlogged ground.

"The young Lions . . . [who] were going in for the ball with a ton of determination . . . bewildered the Cats from the start and their marking, handball and teamwork shocked the Cats"; and Fitzroy scored 3.4 (22) — with full-forward Gary Lazarus scoring two goals and forward-pocket Max Miers one goal — with under-pressure Geelong scoring only 6 behinds from eight shots at goal.

Second quarter
In the second quarter, and kicking against the breeze, "the Lions were hanging on to their [16 point] lead with a grim determination . . . [its] defenders were hurling themselves in for the ball and [Geelong] could not break through" While Fitzroy were able to score three behinds, Geelong, kicking to the scoring end could only manage a single goal, and Fitzroy went in to the half-time break, leading 3.7 (25) to Geelong’s 1.6 (12).

Half-time
Once again, in a Fitzroy room filled with enthusiastic supporters, Clark delivered an inspiring speech.

Third quarter
"Fitzroy led by 13 points at half time, and what looked like a possible win became a certainty in the third term as it piled on 5.4 to [Geelong’s] 1.3."

Last quarter
Despite Geelong's efforts, kicking to the scoring end, the team was only able to reduce its third-quarter deficit of 38 points by two points — scoring 1.4 (10) to Fitzroy's 1.2 (8).

Match Reports
According to the football correspondent of The Age, "with eight men in the side who had not played in the previous round, the eager Lions outplayed Geelong in every phase of the game . . . [and] as the game progressed they not only outmarked and outscored the Cats, but also beat them at their own fast, play-on game" — "Fitzroy, winning in nearly all positions, not only "broke the ice" against Geelong on Saturday . . . it shattered it" —and, moreover, he stressed, although the final score seemed to indicate that Geelong, which had "six shots fewer than Fitzroy", had "[fallen] down badly in attack", the real reason for "this inaccuracy" is that it had been "caused by the strong play of Fitzroy's defenders".

Brian Pert was declared the "best on ground" for his outstanding performance in the match.

Given Wally Clark's specific pre-match instructions, it is significant that, not only did "the Lions' plan to nullify star ruckman Polly Farmer . . . [with Clements] bumping Farmer at the throw-ins and bounces while teammate Fry went for the hit out . . . [prove to be] an outstanding success . . . [but also] Farmer's eclipse [not only] made hard work for the Geelong rovers Bill Goggin and Tony Polinelli [but], at the same time, turned Fitzroy rover John Hayes into a damaging player", and, as well, although they kicked a number of behinds (Hamer, one; Sharrock, three, and Polinelli, four), none of Geelong's left-footers scored a single goal during the game.

Aftermath

Fitzroy
This extraordinary performance, undoubtedly a consequence of Wally Clark’s meticulous planning, strongly contrasts with the fact that not only did Fitzroy fail to win another match during the entire 1963 home-and-away season and, as well, fail to win a single match in the 1964 season, it did not experience another victory until the second round of the 1965 season under its new non-playing coach, Bill Stephen, who had returned to Fitzroy after spending seven years as captain-coach and, later, non-playing coach of the Yarrawonga Football Club in the Ovens & Murray Football League — in other words, given that Kevin Murray did not coach the team on that day, the Fitzroy team was absolutely winless for Murray's entire two-season and 34-match captain-coach career (1963–1964).

Geelong
The Geelong Football Club was so concerned about the comprehensive and overwhelming nature of the Fitzroy victory that, three days later, on Tuesday, 9 July 1963, the club convened a special 100-minute meeting between all of the club’s senior players and all of the members of the club's selection committee. Following this meeting, the team won nine of its next ten matches, including the 1963 Grand Final.

Wally Clark
In the following season (1964), Wally Clark was appointed captain-coach of the Latrobe in the Tasmanian North West Football Union (NWFU). He held the position for four seasons (1964–1967), winning the competition's best-and-fairest award, the Wander Medal, in 1964.

Notes

References
 Lawrence, John (1963), "Cats had No Answer to Fitzroy's Game", The Age, (Monday, 8 July 1963), p.19.
 Lord, Sam (2014), "The Miracle Match", lions.com.au, 17 July 2014: Wally Clark is at the left front, Brian Pert is fifth from the left, Gary Lazarus is third from the right, and Norm Brown is at the far right of the photograph.
 McDonald, Ian (1963), "Lions have Shock Win", The Sporting Globe, Saturday, 6 July 1963.
 McFarlane, Glenn (2014), "Glenn’s 10: After St Kilda’s Shock Win, We Look at some of the Biggest Upsets in History", Herald Sun, Thursday, 24 July 2014.
 Peisse, Ken (2014a), The Day David Downed Goliath, australianfootball.com.
 Peisse, Ken (2014b), Miracle Match: The Day David Downed Goliath, Brunswick St, July 6, 1963, Mt Eliza: Ken Piesse Football & Cricket Books. 
 Spaull, Roger (2014), "Bryan Clements -- Fitzroy FC -- A Day to Remember at the Brunswick Street Oval", Boyles Football Photos, 18 May 2014.
 Wells (Samuel Garnet Wells (1885-1972)) (1963), "The Ups and Downs of Sport" (Cartoon), The Age, (Monday, 8 July 1963), p.17.

External links
 AFL Tables: Match statistics: Fitzroy vs. Geelong (Round 10), Saturday, 6 July 1963.

Australian rules football
History of Australian rules football
Australian Football League games
Australian rules football in Victoria (Australia)
Fitzroy Football Club
Geelong Football Club
1963 in Australian rules football
July 1963 sports events in Australia